"Straight Skirt" (later "Straight Skirts") is a song written by Mary Tarver in 1958 and published by Song Productions, BMI the same year. It was originally recorded by Gene Summers and his Rebels, a rockabilly band from Dallas, Texas and was first released in February 1958 by Jan Records #11-100. On March 8, 1958, Cash Box picked it as their 'Sleeper of the Week'. In Billboard 's 'Reviews of Pop Records' they wrote: "The artist is backed by a chorus and cheerful rockabilly support on this blues. The kids might take to this".

"Straight Skirt" was flipped with "School Of Rock 'n Roll", an upbeat rockabilly song written by James McClung who was a high school friend of Summers. McClung was also the original guitarist for The Rebels and would continue to work with Summers well into the mid-1960s.

In the 1970s, at the beginning of the rockabilly revival in Europe, "School Of Rock 'n Roll" and "Straight Skirt" were re-discovered by a new legion of rockabilly fans and bands. Since that time they have become classic dance floor-fillers and have renewed Gene's career to the extent of worldwide concert appearances from 1980 to the present.

Cover versions
Johnny Devlin & His Devils - 					7” 45rpm single  “Straight Skirt”/”Slipping Around”
						Prestige Records #PSP 0066, New Zealand September 1958

7” 45rpm EP Johnny Devlin “How Would Ya Be”, “Slipping Around”, “Straight Skirt”,  “I’m Grateful”.
Prestige Records PEP 2017, New Zealand October 1958

Sheet Music Johnny Devlin “Straight Skirt”
Southern Music Publishing Company, New Zealand 1958

7” 45rpm EP Johnny Devlin “Rock To Johnny Devlin” “ Slipping
Around,” “ Straight Skirt,” “ I’m Grateful,” “ How Would ‘Ya Be”
Bell Records BE-198, Australia 1959

LP Johnny Devlin “24 Golden Greats”
Music World Records MALPS-536, New Zealand 1972

CD Johnny Devlin “Whole Lotta Shakin’ Goin’ On”
Festival Records CD 26255, Australia 1998

CD Johnny Devlin “Lawdy Miss Clawdy-Prestige Years 1958-1959”
Festival Records CD D26481, Australia 2000

CD Various Artists “The Very Best Of Kiwi Rock & Roll”
EMI Records 5784512, New Zealand 2004
(Johnny Devlin “Straight Skirt” track #2.)

The Diamonds - 					7” 45rpm single “Straight Skirt”/ “Patsy”
						Mercury Records #		, United States 1958

 7" 45rpm single The Diamonds “Straight Skirts”/”Patsy”
						Mercury PYE 7MT.208, U.K. 1958

7” 45rpm EP The Diamonds “Straight Skirts”/”Patsy”
plus The Platters “Winner Take All”/”My Dream” Mercury Records MG 10114, Spain 1959

LP The Diamonds“America’s Famous Song Stylists”
						Mercury Wing Records MGW 12114 (Mono), United States 1959
						(Straight Skirts-  Side 2, Track 3)

LP The Diamonds "America’s Famous Song Stylists"
						Mercury Wing Records MGW 12114, Canada 1959
						(Straight Skirts -  Side 2, Track 3)

LP The Diamonds “The Definitive Collection Of The Diamonds”
						Ebenezer Records 01, (country) (year)
						(Straight Skirts -  Side 1, Track 6)

LP The Diamonds “Best Of The Diamonds”
						Rome Records 157, Italy 1990

CD The Diamonds “Diamonds Collection”
						Stardust Records CD 1010, United States 1996

CD The Diamonds “Little Darlin’-25 Golden Hits”
						Remember Records CD RMB 75072, Portugal 1999

CD The Diamonds "Songbook"
						Canetoad Records CTCD-1013, Australia 2007
						(Straight Skirt-Track #11)

Ronnie Dawson -  LP Ronnie Dawson “Rockin’ Bones”
						No Hit Records LP-001, U.K. 1988

CD Ronnie Dawson “Rockin’ Bones”
						No Hit Records CD-001, U.K. 1993

CD Ronnie Dawson “Rockin’ Bones The Legendary Masters”
Crystal Clear Sound Records CD CCR 9643-2, United States 1996

The  Sureshots -  CD “Rock ‘n Roll Ball” (‘Live from Finland’)
						Empire Records EMPCD-105,  U.K. 2005

References

External links

Sources
Liner notes "The Ultimate School Of Rock & Roll" 1997 United States
Article and sessionography in issue 15 (1977) of New Kommotion Magazine UK
Article and sessionography in issue 23 (1980) of New Kommotion Magazine UK
Feature article and sessionography in issue 74 (1999) of Rockin' Fifties Magazine Germany
Feature article with photo spread in issue 53 (2000) of Bill Griggs' Rockin' 50s Magazine United States
Feature Article with photo spread in issue 54 (2000) of Bill Griggs' Rockin' 50s Magazine United States

1958 songs
Novelty songs
Gene Summers songs
American songs
1958 debut singles
Songs written by Mary Tarver